The Embassy of Sri Lanka in Moscow ( Shri Lanka Thanapathi Karyalaya, Moskaw) is the diplomatic mission of Sri Lanka to the Russian Federation. The embassy is also accredited to Armenia, Belarus, Moldova, Kazakhstan and Uzbekistan. The current Ambassador serving in the country - Professor Janitha Abewickrema Liyanage.

Ambassadors
Prof. Janitha Abewickrema Liyanage

References

External links
 

Sri Lanka
Moscow
Russia–Sri Lanka relations